The 1981 Volvo Women's Cup was a women's tennis tournament played on outdoor hard courts at the Ramapo College in Mahwah, New Jersey in the United States, It was part of the Toyota International Series circuit of the 1981 WTA Tour and classified as a Category 3 event. It was the fourth edition of the tournament and was held from August 24 through August 30, 1981. Second-seeded Hana Mandlíková won her second consecutive singles title at the event and earned $20,000 first-prize money.

Finals

Singles
 Hana Mandlíková defeated  Pam Casale 6–2, 6–2
It was Mandlíková's 3rd singles title of the year and the 16th of her career.

Doubles
 Rosie Casals /  Wendy Turnbull defeated  Candy Reynolds /  Betty Stöve 6–2, 6–1

Prize money

References

External links
 ITF tournament edition details

Virginia Slims of New Jersey
WTA New Jersey
1981 in sports in New Jersey
1981 in American tennis